Kallazhagar is a 1999 Indian Tamil-language action drama film directed by Bharathi starring Vijayakanth and Laila. Nassar, Sonu Sood and Manivannan play other supporting roles, while Deva composed the score and soundtrack for the film. This is the Tamil debut of Laila and Sonu Sood.

The song Vaararu Vaararu Azhagar Vaararu is played every year at the Chithirai fest in Madurai. The song in the movie also takes place in the Chithirai festival.

Cast

Vijayakanth as Kamaluddin /Kamalakannan
Laila as Aandaal
Manivannan
Nassar as Peter
Major Sundarrajan as Iyer
Thilakan as Kamal's father
Sonu Sood as Narayana
Ashwini (Rudra) 
Sumithra as Kamal's mother
S. N. Lakshmi as Aandaal's grandmother
Melanie
Riyaz Khan as Jamal
Vaiyapuri as Govindankutti
Crane Manohar
R. N. R. Manohar
Scissor Manohar
Sarath
Napoleon
Saravanan
John Babu
R. R. Sheela
Bharathi
Rocky Rajesh
V. M. Mani
Mohandass
Kripa

Production
Laila, who had appeared in other regional Indian films, opted to make her debut in Tamil films with Kallazhagar after she had famously rejected a string of other Tamil offers including VIP (1997). The actress also turned down a role in Ajith Kumar's Unnai Thedi (1999), insistent that Kallazhagar should be her first release. Early reports had suggested that Hindi actor Dilip Kumar would also be a part of the cast, but he eventually did not feature.

An elephant called Appu was brought in from Thrissur in Kerala, where the elephant formed one of a stable maintained by the famed Paaramekaavu temple, which forms the venue of the yearly Thrissur Pooram festival. A few scenes from the film were filmed at the Kallazhagar temple in Madhurai, but crowd trouble meant that the makers chose to finish the shoot in sets. For a particular song in the film, Russian dancers imported to dance alongside Laila. As the film marked music composer Deva's 250th album, the film industry felicitated him with a ceremony at the Kamarajar Arangam.

Soundtrack

The music was composed by Deva.

Release
The film was initially scheduled to release on 14 January 1999 coinciding with the festival of Thai Pongal though became delayed due to problems at the censor. The film was rejected by Indian censors, because of its potential to spark religious conflicts - with particularly a scene in which some Muslim extremists masquerade themselves as religious Hindus and join in the celebration of a major festival in a temple - being highlighted as a concern. The team subsequently had to adapt the concept partially. wrote, "Vijay Kanth, Purathchi Kalainjan’ is quite awful. Nazir as the bomb expert is okay. Major Soundar Rajan as the chief priest is quite good". The success of the film prompted the producer Henry to sign Vijayakanth for his next film. The film also created demand for Laila as a lead heroine and she shortly after signed on to appear in a role in Mudhalvan (1999).

References

1990s Tamil-language films
1999 films
Films shot in Madurai
Films with screenplays by Mahendran (filmmaker)